Nagatinskaya is a station of Serpukhovsko-Timiryazevskaya line of Moscow Metro. It was opened together with several other stations of the southern part of the line on 8 November 1983. The passenger dynamics for the station are 54,900 per hour on entry and 57,500 on exit.

Design
There are 2 rows with 26 columns each. The walls are faced with marble of very rich palette where red and black are dominant. Also in these colors there are thematic pietre dure Ancient history of Moscow panels made by E. Zharenova and V. Vasiltsov. These compositions are devoted to the history of construction of Temples and to the start of construction of the Kremlin. An Unusual feature for the Metro is the white columns are made of soft and easy in production koelga marble.

Exits
The exit is to the subway located under the Varshavskoye Highway. Nagatinskaya railway station of the Paveletsky suburban railway line is located nearby.

Moscow Metro stations
Railway stations in Russia opened in 1983
Serpukhovsko-Timiryazevskaya Line
Railway stations located underground in Russia